Shakti Maira (1947-2021) was an Indian artist, sculptor, printmaker, writer and speaker.

Early life
Maira was born in 1947 in Shimla, Himachal Pradesh. He studied at Mayo College, Ajmer, and was an alumnus of St. Stephen's College, Delhi, and IIM Ahmedabad
.

Art
Maira was an artist who worked in many media. His paintings are in oil, acrylic or mixed media on canvas, paper, silk, board, marble, wood and byōbu. His printmaking has encompassed collographs, monotypes, etchings, woodprints and stoneprints. His sculpture and reliefs are in terracotta, stoneware, wood, stone and bronze.

Maira's work is in the National Gallery of Modern Art in New Delhi, India, and in private collections around the world. His art has been exhibited in over forty one-person and group shows around in India, USA, Sri Lanka, France and Netherlands.

Publications

References

External links
 Shakti Maira's website

1947 births
Living people
Artists from Himachal Pradesh